The Crofters' Party was the parliamentary arm of the Highland Land League. It managed to elect five MPs in the 1885 general election and a sixth the following year.

The Highland Land League had started on the isle of Skye and in 1884 protest action was much more widespread with many thousands of crofters became members of the Highland Land League.  A number of candidates stood with the Highland Land League's backing in the 1885 general election and in subsequent elections in the rest of the 19th century.

MPs 
The MPs elected with the backing of the Highland Land League formed themselves into the Crofters' Party, although they were also known as Independent Liberals.  The MPs were:

 Donald Horne Macfarlane, Argyllshire 
 Charles Fraser-Mackintosh, Inverness-shire, who joined the Liberal Unionist Party before the 1892 election, so Galloway Weir was endorsed the Land League in his stead.
 Roderick Macdonald, Ross and Cromarty  
 Gavin Brown Clark, Caithness
 John Macdonald Cameron, Wick Burghs (allied with the Crofters Party)
 Angus Sutherland was defeated in Sutherland, but won in 1886, when the incumbent Marquess of Sutherland did not stand. In 1894, Angus Sutherland was appointed Chairman of the Fishery Board for Scotland, causing a by-election in which John MacLeod was elected unopposed; MacLeod defeated the Liberal Unionist candidate the following year.

Also standing in 1885 was Walter McLaren, a Land League-endorsed Independent Liberal who was beaten by Liberal candidate Robert Finlay in the Inverness Burghs.

A year later Parliament created the Crofters Act, formally the Crofters' Holdings (Scotland) Act 1886, which applied to croft tenure in an area which is now recognisable as a definition of the Highlands and Islands The Act granted real security of tenure of existing crofts and established the first Crofters Commission which had rent-fixing powers. Rents were generally reduced and 50% or more of outstanding arrears were cancelled. The Act failed however to address the issue of severely limited access to land, and crofters renewed their protest actions.

At the same time there was a shift in the political climate: William Gladstone's Liberal government fell from power; the new Conservative government was much less sympathetic to the plight of crofters and much more willing to use troops to quell protests. The Liberal Party appeared to adopt and champion Land League objectives and, as a distinct parliamentary force, the Land League fragmented during the 1890s.

Electoral results

References

Defunct political parties in Scotland
Defunct agrarian political parties
Politics of Highland (council area)
19th century in Scotland
Crofting